Scythris picaepennis is a moth of the family Scythrididae first described by Adrian Hardy Haworth in 1828. It is found in Europe.

Description
The moth has a wingspan of circa 10 mm and is on the wing in July.

The larvae feed in a web on many herbs including common rock-rose (Helianthemum nummularium), common bird's-foot trefoil (Lotus corniculatus), plantains (Plantago species), devil's-bit scabious (Succisa pratensis); thyme (Thymus praecox subsp praecox) and wild thyme (Thymus polytrichus).

References

picaepennis
Moths of Europe
Moths described in 1828
Taxa named by Adrian Hardy Haworth